The 1980 Philadelphia Phillies season was the team's 98th season in Major League Baseball (MLB) and culminated with the Phillies winning the World Series at home by defeating the Kansas City Royals in Game 6 on Oct. 21, 1980.

The team finished with a regular-season record of 91 wins and 71 losses, which was good enough to win the National League East title by just one game over the Montreal Expos. The Phillies went on to defeat the Houston Astros in the NLCS to gain their first NL title since 1950, and then defeated the Kansas City Royals to win their first World Series Championship. The 1980 Phillies became the first team in the divisional era (since 1969) to win the World Series despite having the worst record of all teams in the postseason.

The 1980 Phillies were known as "The Cardiac Kids" because of the many close games.

Beginning that year, following the lead of the Yankees of the AL, the Phillies joined cable station PRISM with game broadcasts on that station.

Off-season
 December 13, 1978: Greg Gross was signed as a free agent by the team.
 December 20, 1979: Jerry Willard was signed as an amateur free agent.
 March 30, 1980: Dave Rader was traded by the Phillies to the Boston Red Sox for a player to be named later and cash. The Red Sox completed the deal by sending Stan Papi to the Phillies on May 12.

Regular season

Season standings

The Phillies won the National League East on the second-to-last day of the season with a 6–4 victory over the Expos in a game played in Montreal on October 4, 1980.

Record vs. opponents

Opening Day Lineup

Notable transactions
 April 7, 1980: Roger Freed was signed as a free agent by the Phillies.
 April 29, 1980: Juan Samuel was signed as an amateur free agent by the Phillies.
 June 3, 1980: 1980 Major League Baseball draft
Steve Jeltz was drafted by the Phillies in the 9th round.
Rocky Childress was drafted by the Phillies in the 21st round.
Darren Daulton was drafted by the Phillies in the 25th round.
Kevin Romine was drafted by the Phillies in the 1st round (21st pick) of the secondary phase, but did not sign.
 July 17, 1980: Lerrin LaGrow was released by the Phillies.
 September 13, 1980: The Phillies traded a player to be named later to the Texas Rangers for Sparky Lyle. The Phillies completed the deal by sending Kevin Saucier to the Rangers on November 19.

Game log

|- style="background:#bfb"
| 1 || April 11 || Expos || 6–3 || Steve Carlton (1–0) || Steve Rogers (0–1) || None || 48,460 || 1–0
|- style="background:#bfb"
| 2 || April 12 || Expos || 6–2 || Dick Ruthven (1–0) || Bill Lee (0–1) || Tug McGraw (1) || 22,065 || 2–0
|- style="background:#fbb"
| 3 || April 13 || Expos || 4–5  || Elías Sosa (1–0) || Lerrin LaGrow (0–1) || None || 28,132 || 2–1
|- style="background:#fbb"
| 4 || April 15 || @ Cardinals || 2–7 || Pete Vuckovich (2–0) || Randy Lerch (0–1) || None || 8,166 || 2–2
|- style="background:#bfb"
| 5 || April 16 || @ Cardinals || 8–3 || Steve Carlton (2–0) || Bob Forsch (0–1) || None || 10,911 || 3–2
|- style="background:#fbb"
| 6 || April 18 || @ Expos || 5–7 || Scott Sanderson (1–0) || Dick Ruthven (1–1) || Woodie Fryman (1) || 41,222 || 3–3
|- style="background:#bfb"
| 7 || April 19 || @ Expos || 13–4 || Larry Christenson (1–0) || Steve Rogers (1–2) || Dickie Noles (1) || 23,088 || 4–3
|- style="background:#fbb"
| 8 || April 20 || @ Expos || 6–7 || Elías Sosa (2–0) || Tug McGraw (0–1) || None || 25,722 || 4–4
|- style="background:#fbb"
| 9 || April 21 || Mets || 0–3 || Ray Burris (2–1) || Steve Carlton (2–1) || Neil Allen (4) || 23,856 || 4–5
|- style="background:#bfb"
| 10 || April 22 || Mets || 14–8 || Kevin Saucier (1–0) || Kevin Kobel (0–2) || None || 21,341 || 5–5
|- style="background:#fbb"
| 11 || April 23 || Mets || 2–3 || Mark Bomback (1–0) || Lerrin LaGrow (0–2) || Jeff Reardon (1) || 23,025 || 5–6
|- style="background:#fbb"
| 12 || April 25 || Cardinals || 1–3 || Pete Vuckovich (3–1) || Randy Lerch (0–2) || Mark Littell (1) || 30,516 || 5–7
|- style="background:#bfb"
| 13 || April 26 || Cardinals || 7–0 || Steve Carlton (3–1) || John Fulgham (1–2) || None || 25,168 || 6–7
|- style="background:#fbb"
| 14 || April 27 || Cardinals || 1–10 || Bob Forsch (1–1) || Dick Ruthven (1–2) || None || 28,200 || 6–8
|- style="background:#bbb"
| – || April 29 || @ Mets || colspan=6 | Postponed (rain); 
|- style="background:#fbb"
| 15 || April 30 || @ Mets || 0–2 || Mark Bomback (2–0) || Randy Lerch (0–3) || None || 4,559 || 6–9

|- style="background:#bfb"
| 16 || May 1 || @ Mets || 2–1 || Steve Carlton (4–1) || Pete Falcone (1–2) || Tug McGraw (2) || 5,928 || 7–9
|- style="background:#bfb"
| 17 || May 2 || Dodgers || 9–5 || Ron Reed (1–0) || Charlie Hough (0–1) || None || 30,294 || 8–9
|- style="background:#bfb"
| 18 || May 3 || Dodgers || 7–3 || Larry Christenson (2–0) || Burt Hooton (2–2) || None || 35,011 || 9–9
|- style="background:#fbb"
| 19 || May 4 || Dodgers || 10–12 || Joe Beckwith (2–0) || Dickie Noles (0–1) || Jerry Reuss (1) || 34,027 || 9–10
|- style="background:#bfb"
| 20 || May 5 || Braves || 7–1 || Steve Carlton (5–1) || Rick Matula (2–2) || None || 26,165 || 10–10
|- style="background:#bfb"
| 21 || May 6 || Braves || 10–5 || Dick Ruthven (2–2) || Doyle Alexander (0–2) || Dickie Noles (2) || 25,302 || 11–10
|- style="background:#bbb"
| – || May 7 || Braves || colspan=6 | Postponed (rain); 
|- style="background:#fbb"
| 22 || May 9 || @ Reds || 2–5 || Charlie Leibrandt (3–2) || Randy Lerch (0–4) || None || 32,583 || 11–11
|- style="background:#fbb"
| 23 || May 10 || @ Reds || 3–5 || Tom Seaver (2–1) || Steve Carlton (5–2) || Tom Hume (5) || 28,919 || 11–12
|- style="background:#bfb"
| 24 || May 11 || @ Reds || 7–3 || Dick Ruthven (3–2) || Mike LaCoss (3–3) || None || 25,920 || 12–12
|- style="background:#fbb"
| 25 || May 13 || @ Braves || 3–7 || Doyle Alexander (1–2) || Randy Lerch (0–5) || Rick Camp (1) || 10,146 || 12–13
|- style="background:#bfb"
| 26 || May 14 || @ Braves || 9–1 || Steve Carlton (6–2) || Larry McWilliams (2–3) || None || 4,625 || 13–13
|- style="background:#bfb"
| 27 || May 16 || @ Astros || 3–0 || Dick Ruthven (4–2) || J. R. Richard (4–2) || None || 33,610 || 14–13
|- style="background:#bfb"
| 28 || May 17 || @ Astros || 4–2 || Larry Christenson (3–0) || Joe Niekro (4–3) || Dickie Noles (3) || 43,525 || 15–13
|- style="background:#fbb"
| 29 || May 18 || @ Astros || 0–3 || Nolan Ryan (2–3) || Randy Lerch (0–6) || None || 33,950 || 15–14
|- style="background:#bfb"
| 30 || May 19 || Reds || 6–4 || Steve Carlton (7–2) || Frank Pastore (4–2) || Ron Reed (1) || 25,109 || 16–14
|- style="background:#fbb"
| 31 || May 20 || Reds || 6–7 || Paul Moskau (2–0) || Dick Ruthven (4–3) || Doug Bair (3) || 25,202 || 16–15
|- style="background:#bfb"
| 32 || May 21 || Reds || 9–8 || Ron Reed (2–0) || Tom Hume (3–4) || None || 26,099 || 17–15
|- style="background:#bfb"
| 33 || May 23 || Astros || 3–0 || Steve Carlton (8–2) || Nolan Ryan (2–4) || None || 27,822 || 18–15
|- style="background:#bfb"
| 34 || May 24 || Astros || 5–4 || Kevin Saucier (2–0) || Joaquín Andújar (0–2) || Tug McGraw (3) || 28,539 || 19–15
|- style="background:#bfb"
| 35 || May 25 || Astros || 6–2 || Dick Ruthven (5–3) || Ken Forsch (5–3) || None || 37,349 || 20–15
|- style="background:#bfb"
| 36 || May 26 || Pirates || 7–6 || Ron Reed (3–0) || Kent Tekulve (5–3) || None || 45,394 || 21–15
|- style="background:#fbb"
| 37 || May 27 || Pirates || 2–3  || Enrique Romo (3–0) || Dickie Noles (0–2) || Kent Tekulve (6) || 35,989 || 21–16
|- style="background:#bfb"
| 38 || May 28 || Pirates || 6–3 || Randy Lerch (1–6) || Don Robinson (1–1) || Ron Reed (2) || 30,209 || 22–16
|- style="background:#fbb"
| 39 || May 29 || Pirates || 4–5 || Eddie Solomon (2–0) || Dick Ruthven (5–4) || Enrique Romo (2) || 30,630 || 22–17
|- style="background:#fbb"
| 40 || May 30 || @ Cubs || 7–10 || Rick Reuschel (4–4) || Dan Larson (0–1) || None || 8,632 || 22–18
|- style="background:#bfb"
| 41 || May 31 || @ Cubs || 7–0 || Steve Carlton (9–2) || Willie Hernández (1–4) || None || 26,937 || 23–18

|- style="background:#fbb"
| 42 || June 1 || @ Cubs || 4–5 || Dick Tidrow (2–0) || Ron Reed (3–1) || Bruce Sutter (11) || 20,051 || 23–19
|- style="background:#fbb"
| 43 || June 2 || @ Pirates || 3–9 || Don Robinson (2–1) || Randy Lerch (1–7) || None || 19,990 || 23–20
|- style="background:#fbb"
| 44 || June 3 || @ Pirates || 3–4 || Grant Jackson (5–1) || Tug McGraw (0–2) || None || 22,141 || 23–21
|- style="background:#bfb"
| 45 || June 4 || @ Pirates || 4–3 || Steve Carlton (10–2) || John Candelaria (2–5) || None || 31,075 || 24–21
|- style="background:#bfb"
| 46 || June 6 || Cubs || 6–5 || Bob Walk (1–0) || Mike Krukow (3–6) || Tug McGraw (4) || 30,189 || 25–21
|- style="background:#bfb"
| 47 || June 7 || Cubs || 5–2 || Randy Lerch (2–7) || Rick Reuschel (5–5) || Dickie Noles (4) || 31,153 || 26–21
|- style="background:#fbb"
| 48 || June 8 || Cubs || 0–2 || Lynn McGlothen (3–2) || Dick Ruthven (5–5) || Bruce Sutter (12) || 40,206 || 26–22
|- style="background:#fbb"
| 49 || June 9 || Giants || 1–3 || Allen Ripley (1–0) || Dickie Noles (0–3) || Greg Minton (2) || 28,702 || 26–23
|- style="background:#bfb"
| 50 || June 10 || Giants || 4–3 || Kevin Saucier (3–0) || Bob Knepper (4–8) || Ron Reed (3) || 32,635 || 27–23
|- style="background:#fbb"
| 51 || June 11 || Giants || 4–7 || Ed Whitson (3–7) || Randy Lerch (2–8) || Greg Minton (3) || 37,844 || 27–24
|- style="background:#bfb"
| 52 || June 13 || Padres || 9–6 || Dick Ruthven (6–5) || Randy Jones (4–6) || None || 37,873 || 28–24
|- style="background:#bfb"
| 53 || June 14 || Padres || 3–1 || Steve Carlton (11–2) || Steve Mura (0–2) || Tug McGraw (5) || 35,231 || 29–24
|- style="background:#bfb"
| 54 || June 15 || Padres || 8–5 || Bob Walk (2–0) || Rick Wise (3–4) || Lerrin LaGrow (1) || 36,374 || 30–24
|- style="background:#bfb"
| 55 || June 16 || @ Dodgers || 3–2  || Ron Reed (4–1) || Rick Sutcliffe (1–4) || Tug McGraw (6) || 41,340 || 31–24
|- style="background:#bfb"
| 56 || June 17 || @ Dodgers || 6–5 || Ron Reed (5–1) || Bobby Castillo (1–3) || Tug McGraw (7) || 40,786 || 32–24
|- style="background:#bfb"
| 57 || June 18 || @ Padres || 5–1 || Steve Carlton (12–2) || Bob Shirley (5–3) || None || 15,621 || 33–24
|- style="background:#fbb"
| 58 || June 19 || @ Padres || 3–4 || Dennis Kinney (2–1) || Kevin Saucier (3–1) || Rollie Fingers (8) || 16,712 || 33–25
|- style="background:#fbb"
| 59 || June 20 || @ Giants || 1–5 || Allen Ripley (2–1) || Dan Larson (0–2) || None || 9,490 || 33–26
|- style="background:#fbb"
| 60 || June 21 || @ Giants || 3–9 || Ed Whitson (5–7) || Randy Lerch (2–9) || None || 11,809 || 33–27
|- style="background:#bfb"
| 61 || June 22 || @ Giants || 4–3 || Steve Carlton (13–2) || Vida Blue (9–4) || None || 27,315 || 34–27
|- style="background:#fbb"
| 62 || June 24 || Expos || 6–7  || Elías Sosa (5–3) || Tug McGraw (0–3) || None || 32,101 || 34–28
|- style="background:#bfb"
| 63 || June 25 || Expos || 2–1  || Ron Reed (6–1) || Stan Bahnsen (5–2) || None || 31,416 || 35–28
|- style="background:#fbb"
| 64 || June 26 || Expos || 0–1 || Scott Sanderson (7–4) || Randy Lerch (2–10) || None || 31,696 || 35–29
|- style="background:#fbb"
| 65 || June 27 || Mets || 2–3 || John Pacella (1–0) || Steve Carlton (13–3) || Tom Hausman (1) || 37,123 || 35–30
|- style="background:#fbb"
| 66 || June 28  || Mets || 1–2  || Neil Allen (4–5) || Ron Reed (6–2) || None ||  || 35–31
|- style="background:#fbb"
| 67 || June 28  || Mets || 4–5 || Tom Hausman (3–2) || Kevin Saucier (3–2) || Neil Allen (13) || 47,169 || 35–32
|- style="background:#bfb"
| 68 || June 29 || Mets || 5–2 || Bob Walk (3–0) || Pat Zachry (2–5) || Lerrin LaGrow (2) || 41,113 || 36–32
|- style="background:#bfb"
| 69 || June 30 || @ Expos || 7–5 || Dickie Noles (1–3) || Bill Gullickson (0–2) || Ron Reed (4) || 36,347 || 37–32

|- style="background:#bfb"
| 70 || July 1 || @ Expos || 5–4  || Randy Lerch (3–10) || Woodie Fryman (1–3) || Lerrin LaGrow (3) || 33,761 || 38–32
|- style="background:#fbb"
| 71 || July 2 || @ Expos || 1–6 || Steve Rogers (10–6) || Steve Carlton (13–4) || None || 23,233 || 38–33
|- style="background:#bfb"
| 72 || July 3  || @ Cardinals || 2–1 || Dick Ruthven (7–5) || Bob Forsch (5–6) || None ||  || 39–33
|- style="background:#bfb"
| 73 || July 3  || @ Cardinals || 8–1 || Bob Walk (4–0) || Jim Otten (0–3) || None || 38,038 || 40–33
|- style="background:#fbb"
| 74 || July 4 || @ Cardinals || 0–1  || Bob Sykes (3–6) || Kevin Saucier (3–3) || None || 15,481 || 40–34
|- style="background:#fbb"
| 75 || July 5 || @ Cardinals || 1–6 || Jim Kaat (3–6) || Randy Lerch (3–11) || None || 27,932 || 40–35
|- style="background:#bfb"
| 76 || July 6 || @ Cardinals || 8–3 || Steve Carlton (14–4) || Pete Vuckovich (7–6) || None || 17,769 || 41–35
|- style="background:#bbcaff;"
| – || July 8 ||colspan=7 |1980 Major League Baseball All-Star Game at Dodger Stadium in Los Angeles
|- style="background:#bfb"
| 77 || July 10 || Cubs || 5–3 || Dick Ruthven (8–5) || Mike Krukow (6–10) || Dickie Noles (5) || 33,130 || 42–35
|- style="background:#bfb"
| 78 || July 11 || Cubs || 7–2 || Bob Walk (5–0) || Lynn McGlothen (6–6) || Ron Reed (5) || 50,204 || 43–35
|- style="background:#bfb"
| 79 || July 12 || Pirates || 5–4 || Kevin Saucier (4–3) || Kent Tekulve (5–5) || None || 53,254 || 44–35
|- style="background:#fbb"
| 80 || July 13 || Pirates || 3–7 || Don Robinson (3–4) || Nino Espinosa (0–1) || Kent Tekulve (11) || 48,132 || 44–36
|- style="background:#fbb"
| 81 || July 14 || Pirates || 11–13 || Grant Jackson (7–2) || Ron Reed (6–3) || None || 44,245 || 44–37
|- style="background:#fbb"
| 82 || July 15 || @ Astros || 2–3 || Joe Sambito (4–1) || Dick Ruthven (8–6) || None || 24,223 || 44–38
|- style="background:#bfb"
| 83 || July 16 || @ Astros || 4–2 || Bob Walk (6–0) || Ken Forsch (8–9) || None || 28,532 || 45–38
|- style="background:#bfb"
| 84 || July 17 || @ Astros || 2–1 || Steve Carlton (15–4) || Joe Niekro (10–8) || None || 26,403 || 46–38
|- style="background:#bfb"
| 85 || July 18 || @ Braves || 7–2 || Nino Espinosa (1–1) || Phil Niekro (7–12) || Dickie Noles (6) || 13,908 || 47–38
|- style="background:#fbb"
| 86 || July 19  || @ Braves || 2–5 || Doyle Alexander (8–5) || Dick Ruthven (8–7) || None ||  || 47–39
|- style="background:#fbb"
| 87 || July 19  || @ Braves || 2–7 || Tommy Boggs (4–5) || Dan Larson (0–3) || Rick Camp (4) || 35,524 || 47–40
|- style="background:#fbb"
| 88 || July 20 || @ Braves || 2–3 || Larry McWilliams (7–6) || Bob Walk (6–1) || None || 9,335 || 47–41
|- style="background:#fbb"
| 89 || July 21 || @ Reds || 4–5 || Charlie Leibrandt (9–6) || Randy Lerch (3–12) || Tom Hume (15) || 27,177 || 47–42
|- style="background:#fbb"
| 90 || July 22 || @ Reds || 2–3 || Mario Soto (4–4) || Steve Carlton (15–5) || None || 28,079 || 47–43
|- style="background:#fbb"
| 91 || July 23 || @ Reds || 3–7 || Bruce Berenyi (2–0) || Nino Espinosa (1–2) || Tom Hume (16) || 29,614 || 47–44
|- style="background:#bfb"
| 92 || July 25  || Braves || 5–4  || Dick Ruthven (9–7) || Rick Camp (3–4) || None ||  || 48–44
|- style="background:#fbb"
| 93 || July 25  || Braves || 0–3 || Tommy Boggs (5–5) || Dan Larson (0–4) || None || 38,408 || 48–45
|- style="background:#bfb"
| 94 || July 26 || Braves || 6–3 || Bob Walk (7–1) || Phil Niekro (8–13) || Ron Reed (6) || 33,112 || 49–45
|- style="background:#bfb"
| 95 || July 27 || Braves || 17–4 || Steve Carlton (16–5) || Rick Matula (6–9) || None || 35,249 || 50–45
|- style="background:#fbb"
| 96 || July 28 || Astros || 2–3  || Joe Sambito (6–1) || Ron Reed (6–4) || None || 30,181 || 50–46
|- style="background:#bfb"
| 97 || July 29 || Astros || 9–6 || Kevin Saucier (5–3) || Frank LaCorte (7–3) || Tug McGraw (8) || 30,252 || 51–46
|- style="background:#bfb"
| 98 || July 30 || Astros || 6–4 || Dick Ruthven (10–7) || Nolan Ryan (5–8) || Tug McGraw (9) || 31,342 || 52–46

|- style="background:#bfb"
| 99 || August 1 || Reds || 3–1 || Bob Walk (8–1) || Charlie Leibrandt (9–7) || Tug McGraw (10) || 37,409 || 53–46
|- style="background:#fbb"
| 100 || August 2 || Reds || 0–2 || Mike LaCoss (6–9) || Steve Carlton (16–6) || None || 43,244 || 53–47
|- style="background:#bfb"
| 101 || August 3 || Reds || 8–4 || Nino Espinosa (2–2) || Bruce Berenyi (2–2) || Ron Reed (7) || 41,328 || 54–47
|- style="background:#bbb"
| – || August 5 || Cardinals || colspan=6 | Postponed (rain); 
|- style="background:#fbb"
| 102 || August 6 || Cardinals || 0–14 || Bob Sykes (5–8) || Bob Walk (8–2) || None || 31,629 || 54–48
|- style="background:#bfb"
| 103 || August 7 || Cardinals || 3–2 || Steve Carlton (17–6) || John Fulgham (3–4) || Tug McGraw (11) || 31,397 || 55–48
|- style="background:#fbb"
| 104 || August 8 || @ Pirates || 5–6 || Kent Tekulve (8–5) || Tug McGraw (0–4) || Enrique Romo (8) || 30,354 || 55–49
|- style="background:#fbb"
| 105 || August 9 || @ Pirates || 1–4 || John Candelaria (8–11) || Nino Espinosa (2–3) || Kent Tekulve (16) || 39,984 || 55–50
|- style="background:#fbb"
| 106 || August 10  || @ Pirates || 1–7 || Jim Bibby (14–2) || Randy Lerch (3–13) || None ||  || 55–51
|- style="background:#fbb"
| 107 || August 10  || @ Pirates || 1–4 || Don Robinson (4–5) || Dan Larson (0–5) || Kent Tekulve (17) || 37,323 || 55–52
|- style="background:#bfb"
| 108 || August 11 || @ Cubs || 8–5  || Warren Brusstar (1–0) || George Riley (0–2) || None || 10,805 || 56–52
|- style="background:#bfb"
| 109 || August 12 || @ Cubs || 5–2 || Steve Carlton (18–6) || Mike Krukow (7–12) || None || 20,808 || 57–52
|- style="background:#fbb"
| 110 || August 13 || @ Cubs || 1–2 || Dick Tidrow (5–3) || Dick Ruthven (10–8) || None || 13,215 || 57–53
|- style="background:#bfb"
| 111 || August 14 || @ Mets || 8–1 || Nino Espinosa (3–3) || Pat Zachry (6–6) || None || 20,149 || 58–53
|- style="background:#bfb"
| 112 || August 15 || @ Mets || 8–0 || Larry Christenson (4–0) || Mark Bomback (9–4) || Tug McGraw (12) || 40,436 || 59–53
|- style="background:#bfb"
| 113 || August 16 || @ Mets || 11–6 || Bob Walk (9–2) || Craig Swan (5–9) || None || 23,514 || 60–53
|- style="background:#bfb"
| 114 || August 17  || @ Mets || 9–4 || Steve Carlton (19–6) || Ray Burris (6–7) || None ||  || 61–53
|- style="background:#bfb"
| 115 || August 17  || @ Mets || 4–1 || Randy Lerch (4–13) || Roy Lee Jackson (1–4) || Ron Reed (8) || 25,458 || 62–53
|- style="background:#bfb"
| 116 || August 19 || Padres || 7–4 || Dick Ruthven (11–8) || Bob Shirley (9–9) || Tug McGraw (13) || 30,588 || 63–53
|- style="background:#fbb"
| 117 || August 20 || Padres || 5–7 || John Curtis (5–8) || Nino Espinosa (3–4) || Rollie Fingers (16) || 30,403 || 63–54
|- style="background:#bfb"
| 118 || August 21 || Padres || 9–8  || Kevin Saucier (6–3) || Dennis Kinney (4–5) || None || 36,201 || 64–54
|- style="background:#fbb"
| 119 || August 22 || Giants || 3–4  || Al Holland (5–2) || Steve Carlton (19–7) || None || 36,073 || 64–55
|- style="background:#fbb"
| 120 || August 23 || Giants || 2–6 || Allen Ripley (7–6) || Larry Christenson (4–1) || None || 38,541 || 64–56
|- style="background:#bfb"
| 121 || August 24 || Giants || 7–1 || Dick Ruthven (12–8) || Bob Knepper (9–15) || None || 37,325 || 65–56
|- style="background:#fbb"
| 122 || August 25 || Dodgers || 4–8 || Don Stanhouse (2–2) || Dickie Noles (1–4) || None || 34,267 || 65–57
|- style="background:#fbb"
| 123 || August 26 || Dodgers || 4–8 || Bobby Castillo (4–6) || Bob Walk (9–3) || None || 35,358 || 65–58
|- style="background:#bfb"
| 124 || August 27 || Dodgers || 4–3 || Steve Carlton (20–7) || Steve Howe (6–6) || Tug McGraw (14) || 39,116 || 66–58
|- style="background:#bfb"
| 125 || August 29 || @ Padres || 3–2 || Larry Christenson (5–1) || Steve Mura (4–7) || Tug McGraw (15) || 10,742 || 67–58
|- style="background:#bfb"
| 126 || August 30  || @ Padres || 6–1 || Dick Ruthven (13–8) || Bob Shirley (9–10) || None ||  || 68–58
|- style="background:#fbb"
| 127 || August 30  || @ Padres || 1–5 || John Curtis (6–8) || Nino Espinosa (3–5) || None || 13,209 || 68–59
|- style="background:#fbb"
| 128 || August 31 || @ Padres || 3–10 || Gary Lucas (5–7) || Bob Walk (9–4) || Rollie Fingers (18) || 7,815 || 68–60

|- style="background:#bfb"
| 129 || September 1 || @ Giants || 6–4 || Steve Carlton (21–7) || Greg Minton (3–5) || None || 16,952 || 69–60
|- style="background:#bfb"
| 130 || September 2 || @ Giants || 2–1  || Ron Reed (7–4) || Al Holland (5–3) || None || 6,135 || 70–60
|- style="background:#bfb"
| 131 || September 3 || @ Giants || 4–3 || Dick Ruthven (14–8) || Allen Ripley (7–8) || Tug McGraw (16) || 5,504 || 71–60
|- style="background:#bfb"
| 132 || September 4 || @ Dodgers || 3–2 || Bob Walk (10–4) || Jerry Reuss (16–5) || Tug McGraw (17) || 41,864 || 72–60
|- style="background:#fbb"
| 133 || September 5 || @ Dodgers || 0–1 || Don Sutton (10–4) || Steve Carlton (21–8) || Don Stanhouse (5) || 41,019 || 72–61
|- style="background:#fbb"
| 134 || September 6 || @ Dodgers || 3–7 || Bob Welch (12–9) || Randy Lerch (4–14) || Steve Howe (15) || 45,995 || 72–62
|- style="background:#fbb"
| 135 || September 7 || @ Dodgers || 0–6 || Bobby Castillo (6–6) || Dick Ruthven (14–9) || None || 39,083 || 72–63
|- style="background:#bfb"
| 136 || September 8 || Pirates || 6–2 || Tug McGraw (1–4) || Enrique Romo (5–5) || None || 40,576 || 73–63
|- style="background:#bfb"
| 137 || September 9 || Pirates || 5–4  || Warren Brusstar (2–0) || Mark Lee (0–1) || None || 43,333 || 74–63
|- style="background:#bfb"
| 138 || September 10 || @ Mets || 5–0 || Marty Bystrom (1–0) || Mark Bomback (9–7) || None || 6,748 || 75–63
|- style="background:#bfb"
| 139 || September 11 || @ Mets || 5–1 || Dick Ruthven (15–9) || Ray Burris (7–11) || None || 6,376 || 76–63
|- style="background:#fbb"
| 140 || September 12  || Cardinals || 4–7 || Pete Vuckovich (11–9) || Bob Walk (10–5) || John Urrea (2) ||  || 76–64
|- style="background:#fbb"
| 141 || September 12  || Cardinals || 0–5  || John Littlefield (5–3) || Ron Reed (7–5) || None || 44,093 || 76–65
|- style="background:#bfb"
| 142 || September 13 || Cardinals || 2–1 || Steve Carlton (22–8) || Bob Forsch (11–9) || None || 41,728 || 77–65
|- style="background:#bfb"
| 143 || September 14 || Cardinals || 8–4 || Marty Bystrom (2–0) || Silvio Martínez (5–10) || None || 30,137 || 78–65
|- style="background:#fbb"
| 144 || September 16 || @ Pirates || 2–3 || Jim Bibby (17–5) || Dick Ruthven (15–10) || Kent Tekulve (20) || 22,239 || 78–66
|- style="background:#bfb"
| 145 || September 17 || @ Pirates || 5–4  || Tug McGraw (2–4) || Kent Tekulve (8–10) || Sparky Lyle (9) || 23,650 || 79–66
|- style="background:#fbb"
| 146 || September 19 || @ Cubs || 3–4  || Lee Smith (2–0) || Warren Brusstar (2–1) || None || 4,352 || 79–67
|- style="background:#bfb"
| 147 || September 20 || @ Cubs || 7–3 || Marty Bystrom (3–0) || Lynn McGlothen (10–13) || None || 11,713 || 80–67
|- style="background:#bfb"
| 148 || September 21 || @ Cubs || 7–3 || Dick Ruthven (16–10) || Dennis Lamp (10–12) || Ron Reed (9) || 10,190 || 81–67
|- style="background:#bfb"
| 149 || September 22 || @ Cardinals || 3–2  || Steve Carlton (23–8) || Kim Seaman (3–2) || Tug McGraw (18) || 5,654 || 82–67
|- style="background:#fbb"
| 150 || September 23 || @ Cardinals || 3–6 || Al Olmsted (1–0) || Bob Walk (10–6) || John Littlefield (9) || 6,915 || 82–68
|- style="background:#bfb"
| 151 || September 24 || Mets || 1–0  || Tug McGraw (3–4) || Neil Allen (7–9) || None || 24,258 || 83–68
|- style="background:#bfb"
| 152 || September 25 || Mets || 2–1 || Marty Bystrom (4–0) || Roy Lee Jackson (1–6) || Sparky Lyle (10) || 20,525 || 84–68
|- style="background:#bfb"
| 153 || September 26 || Expos || 2–1 || Tug McGraw (4–4) || David Palmer (7–6) || None || 50,887 || 85–68
|- style="background:#fbb"
| 154 || September 27 || Expos || 3–4 || Scott Sanderson (16–10) || Steve Carlton (23–9) || Woodie Fryman (17) || 53,058 || 85–69
|- style="background:#fbb"
| 155 || September 28 || Expos || 3–8 || Steve Rogers (16–11) || Bob Walk (10–7) || None || 40,305 || 85–70
|- style="background:#bfb"
| 156 || September 29 || Cubs || 6–5  || Kevin Saucier (7–3) || Dennis Lamp (10–13) || None || 21,127 || 86–70
|- style="background:#bfb"
| 157 || September 30 || Cubs || 14–2 || Marty Bystrom (5–0) || Lynn McGlothen (11–14) || None || 24,349 || 87–70

|- style="background:#bfb"
| 158 || October 1 || Cubs || 5–0 || Steve Carlton (24–9) || Dennis Lamp (10–14) || None || 25,658 || 88–70
|- style="background:#bfb"
| 159 || October 2 || Cubs || 4–2 || Bob Walk (11–7) || Bill Caudill (4–6) || Tug McGraw (19) || 23,806 || 89–70
|- style="background:#bfb"
| 160 || October 3 || @ Expos || 2–1 || Dick Ruthven (17–10) || Scott Sanderson (16–11) || Tug McGraw (20) || 57,121 || 90–70
|- style="background:#bfb"
| 161 || October 4 || @ Expos || 6–4  || Tug McGraw (5–4) || Stan Bahnsen (7–6) || None || 50,794 || 91–70
|- style="background:#fbb"
| 162 || October 5 || @ Expos || 7–8  || Charlie Lea (7–5) || Warren Brusstar (2–2) || None || 30,104 || 91–71

|-
| style="font-size:88%"|
The May 4, 1980, game was protested by the Phillies in the top of the first inning. The protest was later denied.
The August 11 game was suspended in the bottom of the 14th with the score 5–5 and was completed August 12, 1980.
The August 24, 1980, game was protested by the Giants in the bottom of the fourth inning. The protest was later denied.
|-
|  Source:

Roster

Player stats

Batting

Starters by position
Note: Pos = Position; G = Games played; AB = At bats; R = Runs; H = Hits; 2B = Doubles; 3B = Triples; Avg. = Batting average; HR = Home runs; RBI = Runs batted in; SB = Stolen bases

Other batters
Note: G = Games played; AB = At bats; R = Runs; H = Hits; Avg. = Batting average; HR = Home runs; RBI = Runs batted in; SB = Stolen bases

Pitching

Starting pitchers
Note: G = Games pitched; IP = Innings pitched; W = Wins; L = Losses; ERA = Earned run average; BB = Walks allowed; SO = Strikeouts

Other pitchers
Note: G = Games pitched; IP = Innings pitched; W = Wins; L = Losses; ERA = Earned run average; BB = Walks allowed; SO = Strikeouts

Relief pitchers
Note: G = Games pitched; IP = Innings pitched; W = Wins; L = Losses; SV = Saves; ERA = Earned run average; SO = Strikeouts

Postseason

National League Championship Series

Game 1
October 7: Veterans Stadium, Philadelphia

Game 2
October 8: Veterans Stadium, Philadelphia

Game 3
October 10: Astrodome, Houston, Texas

Game 4
October 11: Astrodome, Houston, Texas

Game 5
October 12: Astrodome, Houston, Texas

World Series 

When the modern-day World Series began in 1903, the National and American Leagues each had eight teams. With their victory in the 1980 World Series, the Phillies became the last of the "Original Sixteen" franchises to win a Series. The 1980 World Series was the first World Series to be played entirely on artificial turf. Prior to 1980, the Phillies hadn't won a World Series game since Game 1 of the 1915 World Series against the Boston Red Sox.

The series offered many intriguing storylines. Phillies pitcher Bob Walk became the first rookie to start the first game of a World Series since Joe Black of the Brooklyn Dodgers in 1952. The 1980 World Series was the first of numerous World Series that journeyman outfielder Lonnie Smith (then with the Phillies) participated in.

Game 6 would be the culmination for the Phillies' first championship.  Philadelphia scored two in the third on a Mike Schmidt single. It was all that Steve Carlton and Tug McGraw would need for the 4–1 win. Kansas City threatened by loading the bases in the eighth and the ninth innings before Tug McGraw struck out Willie Wilson for the third out in the final inning.

While Mike Schmidt was the official MVP of the 1980 World Series, the Babe Ruth Award (another World Series MVP) was given to Tug McGraw. As of 2019, this is the last World Series in which both participating franchises had yet to win a World Series in their history. This was the first time that had happened since .

The entire state of Pennsylvania, not just Philadelphia, celebrated the Phillies' win. Minutes after the final out, Governor Dick Thornburgh declared the next day "Philadelphia Phillies Day."

Composite box score
 1980 World Series (4–2): Philadelphia Phillies (N.L.) over Kansas City Royals (A.L.)

Awards and honors 
In 1980, Mike Schmidt won the National League's Most Valuable Player Award in a unanimous vote. He led the league in home runs with 48 (by a margin of 13 over his nearest competitor). Schmidt was also selected as MVP of the World Series, after hitting two homers and driving in seven runs as his team won their first World Series Championship over the George Brett-led Kansas City Royals.

Steve Carlton received the National League Cy Young Award.

Tug McGraw received the Babe Ruth Award.

Manny Trillo was honored as the MVP of the National League Championship Series.

All-Stars 
1980 Major League Baseball All-Star Game
 Steve Carlton, reserve
 Pete Rose, reserve
 Mike Schmidt, reserve

Farm system

* League Champions

Other Philadelphia sports teams of the same era

In the National Hockey League, the Philadelphia Flyers reached the Stanley Cup Finals in May 1980 before losing four games to two to the New York Islanders.

In the National Basketball Association also in May 1980, the Philadelphia 76ers reached the NBA Finals before losing four games to two to the Los Angeles Lakers.

The 1980 Philadelphia Eagles would qualify for Super Bowl XV, where they were defeated 27–10 by the Oakland Raiders.

Notes

References
 1980 Philadelphia Phillies at Baseball Reference
 1980 Philadelphia Phillies at Baseball Almanac

Philadelphia Phillies seasons
Philadelphia Phillies season
National League East champion seasons
National League champion seasons
World Series champion seasons
Philadelphia